Amegilla puttalama, is a species of bee belonging to the family Apidae subfamily Apinae.

References

External links
 Animal Discovery Web
 academia.edu

Apinae
Insects described in 1913